"Heroes" is a single by the Greek singer and Eurovision Song Contest winner, Helena Paparizou. The song was specially written to be the official theme song of the 2006 European Championships in Athletics, held in Paparizou's home town Gothenburg. The song is featured on Helena's second international album The Game of Love, which was released on November 15, 2006 in Scandinavia.

The song is mainly in English, but does contain some Spanish lyrics such as  — cognate with 'long live the heroes' — and with very little Greek such as 'Nikes gia panta' — which means 'victories forever'.

"Heroes" was released in August 2006 in Sweden; becoming Paparizou's fifth Swedish single release. It was her first single which debuted at number one position in the Swedish Singles Chart and second to peak at number one. When "Heroes" entered the charts Paparizou's previous single "Mambo!" was still charting. On September 10, 2006, the song entered the Swedish hitlist Svensktoppen.

Track listing
CD single
"Heroes" – 2:54
"Heroes" [Freerunners Radio Edit] – 2:38
"Heroes" [Freerunners X10ded] – 4:36

Charts Positions

2006 singles
Helena Paparizou songs
Sporting songs
Number-one singles in Sweden
English-language Swedish songs
2006 songs
Songs written by Niclas Molinder
Songs written by Joacim Persson
Song recordings produced by Twin (production team)
Bonnier Music singles